Timothy Charles Briglin (born April 7, 1966) is an American politician who has served in the Vermont House of Representatives since 2014.

He retired at the 2022 Vermont House of Representatives election.

References

Living people
Cornell University alumni
Stanford University alumni
21st-century American politicians
Democratic Party members of the Vermont House of Representatives
1966 births